Giuseppe Bernardoni (1897–1942) was an Italian sprinter. He competed in the Men's 400 metres at the 1920 Summer Olympics.

References

External links
 

1897 births
1942 deaths
Athletes (track and field) at the 1920 Summer Olympics
Italian male sprinters
Olympic athletes of Italy
Sportspeople from Como